The Archdiocese of San Francisco (Latin: Archdiœcesis Sancti Francisci; Spanish: Archidiócesis de San Francisco) is a Latin Church ecclesiastical territory or diocese of the Catholic Church in the northern California region of the United States. It covers the City and County of San Francisco and the Counties of Marin and San Mateo. The Archdiocese of San Francisco was canonically erected on July 29, 1853, by Pope Pius IX and its cathedral is the Cathedral of Saint Mary of the Assumption.

This archdiocese is the metropolitan see of a province which also has the dioceses of Honolulu (Hawaii), Las Vegas (Nevada), Reno (Nevada), Salt Lake City (Utah), Oakland (California), San Jose (California), Santa Rosa (California), Sacramento (California), and Stockton (California).

History
The first church in the Archdiocese of San Francisco is older than the archdiocese itself; Mission San Francisco de Asís was founded on June 29, 1776 by Franciscan Friars. The mission church that stands today was completed in 1791 and attached next door is Mission Dolores Basilica, completed in 1918 to replace the previous red-brick church at the same site that was destroyed by the 1906 earthquake.  The present building was elevated to the status of a Basilica in 1952. The Franciscans who founded the mission also are credited with naming the City and County of San Francisco, and the entire region, after their patron saint, Francis of Assisi.

On July 27, 2012, the Holy See announced that it had accepted the retirement of Archbishop George Hugh Niederauer and appointed Salvatore J. Cordileone as new archbishop of San Francisco.  He was installed on October 4, 2012, the patronal Feast day of Saint Francis of Assisi at the Cathedral of Saint Mary of the Assumption. He had previously been Bishop of Oakland, California.

The See of San Francisco is administered by the Archbishop of San Francisco, who as metropolitan oversees the entire ecclesiastical province of San Francisco. Its suffragans include the Dioceses of Honolulu, Las Vegas, Oakland, Reno, Sacramento, Salt Lake City, San Jose, Santa Rosa, and Stockton.

San Francisco once included among its suffragans the now-Metropolitan Archdiocese of Agaña, Guam and the former dioceses of Grass Valley, Diocese of Los Angeles-San Diego, Monterey, Monterey-Fresno, and Diocese of Monterey-Los Angeles.

The Chancery Office (also known as the Pastoral Center) of the Archdiocese of San Francisco, originally located in 1853 at California and Dupont Streets, moved in 1891 to 1100 Franklin Street, in 1955 re-located to 445 Church Street, on the Mission Dolores Basilica property. The present headquarters, as of 2001 of the Archdiocese of San Francisco are located at One Peter Yorke Way, a short street in San Francisco named after Peter Yorke, an Irish-American Catholic priest. Peter Yorke Way and Starr King Way are off of Geary Street as it becomes Geary Boulevard.

On October 7, 2017, the Feast of the Holy Rosary, Archbishop Cordileone consecrated the archdiocese to the Immaculate Heart of Mary. 

From May to December 2019, the Archdiocese of San Francisco provided numerous documents to California State Attorney Xavier Becerra in preparation for a series of pending lawsuits which are expected to be filed after a new California law which will temporarily remove the statute of limitations goes into effect on January 1, 2020. The Archdiocese of San Francisco is one of six Catholic dioceses throughout the state of California which is expected to be subpoenaed in the upcoming lawsuits.

Bishops
The lists of archbishops, coadjutor archbishops, and auxiliary bishops and their terms of service, followed by other priests of this diocese who became bishops:

Archbishops of San Francisco
 Joseph Sadoc Alemany y Conill, O.P. (1853–1884)
 Patrick William Riordan (1884–1914; Coadjutor Archbishop 1883-1884)  - George Thomas Montgomery, Coadjutor Archbishop (1902–1907), appointed Bishop of Monterrey-Los Angeles
 Edward Joseph Hanna (1915–1935)
 John Joseph Mitty (1935–1961; Coadjutor Archbishop 1932-1935)
 Joseph Thomas McGucken (1962–1977)
 John Raphael Quinn (1977–1995)
 William Joseph Levada (1995–2005), appointed Prefect of the Congregation for the Doctrine of the Faith (elevated to Cardinal in 2006)
 George Hugh Niederauer (2006–2012)
 Salvatore Joseph Cordileone (2012–present)

Auxiliary bishops
 Denis Joseph O'Connell (1908–1912), appointed Bishop of Richmond
 Edward Joseph Hanna (1912–1914), appointed Archbishop here
 Thomas Arthur Connolly (1939–1948), appointed Coadjutor Bishop and later Bishop and Archbishop of Seattle
 Hugh Aloysius Donohoe (1947–1962), appointed Bishop of Stockton
 James Thomas O'Dowd (1948–1950)
 Merlin Joseph Guilfoyle (1950–1969), appointed Bishop of Stockton
 William Joseph McDonald (1967–1979)
 Mark Joseph Hurley (1968–1969), appointed Bishop of Santa Rosa
 Norman Francis McFarland (1970–1974), appointed Bishop of Reno-Las Vegas
 Francis Anthony Quinn (1978–1979), appointed Bishop of Sacramento
 Roland Pierre DuMaine (1978–1981), appointed Bishop of San Jose in California
 Daniel Francis Walsh (1981–1987), appointed Bishop of Reno and later Bishop of Las Vegas and Bishop of Santa Rosa in California
 Carlos Arthur Sevilla, S.J. (1988–1996), appointed Bishop of Yakima
 Patrick Joseph McGrath (1988–1998), appointed Coadjutor Bishop and later Bishop of San Jose in California
 John Charles Wester (1998–2007), appointed Coadjutor Bishop and Bishop of Salt Lake City and later Archbishop of Santa Fe
 Ignatius Chung Wang (2002–2009)
 William Joseph Justice (2008–2017)
 Robert Walter McElroy (2010–2015), appointed Bishop of San Diego
 Robert Francis Christian, O.P. (2018–2019)

Other priests of this diocese who became bishops
 Lawrence Scanlan, appointed Vicar Apostolic of Utah in 1887 and later Bishop of Salt Lake City
 Patrick Joseph James Keane, appointed Auxiliary Bishop of Sacramento in 1920 and later Bishop of Sacramento
 James Joseph Sweeney, appointed Bishop of Honolulu in 1941
 John Joseph Scanlan, appointed Auxiliary Bishop of Honolulu in 1954 and later Bishop of Honolulu
 William Joseph Moran, appointed auxiliary bishop of United States of America Military in 1965
 Francis Thomas Hurley, appointed Auxiliary Bishop in 1970 and Bishop of Juneau and later Archbishop of Anchorage
 John Stephen Cummins, appointed Auxiliary Bishop of Sacramento in 1974 and later Bishop of Oakland
 Richard John Garcia (priest here, 1973-1981), appointed Auxiliary Bishop of Sacramento in 1997 and later Bishop of Monterey California
 Randolph Roque Calvo, appointed Bishop of Reno in 2005
 Thomas Anthony Daly, appointed Auxiliary Bishop of San Jose in California in 2011 and later Bishop of Spokane
 Steven Joseph Lopes, appointed Bishop of the Personal Ordinariate of the Chair of Saint Peter in 2015

Cathedrals
 Old Cathedral of Saint Mary of the Immaculate Conception — California Street and Grant Avenue, in Chinatown (1854–1891).
 Cathedral of Saint Mary of the Assumption — 1001 Van Ness Avenue at O'Farrell Street (1891–1962); destroyed by fire in 1962, the site of the former studios of KRON-TV.
 Cathedral of Saint Mary of the Assumption — 1111 Gough at Geary Boulevard on Cathedral Hill; modern structure (1971–present).

Churches

The Archdiocese of San Francisco includes the City and County of San Francisco and the Counties of Marin and San Mateo. The archdiocese includes many historic churches including Mission San Francisco de Asís, the oldest building in San Francisco, and Saints Peter and Paul Church, known as the Italian cathedral of the West. A complete list of the churches of the archdiocese is found at List of churches in the Roman Catholic Archdiocese of San Francisco.

Education

All full-time faculty, librarians, and counselors at Archbishop Riordan, Junipero Serra, Marin Catholic, and Sacred Heart Cathedral high schools are represented by The San Francisco Archdiocesan Federation of Teachers, Local 2240, a labor union affiliate of the California Federation of Teachers (AFT, AFL–CIO), and have a collective bargaining agreement with the Archdiocese of San Francisco. The CBA governs the terms of their employment.

Secondary schools
Marin County
 Marin Catholic High School (Kentfield in unincorporated Marin County)

San Francisco
 Archbishop Riordan High School
 Convent of the Sacred Heart High School
 Immaculate Conception Academy
 Sacred Heart Cathedral Preparatory
 St. Ignatius College Preparatory
 Stuart Hall High School

San Mateo County
 Junípero Serra High School (San Mateo)
 Mercy High School (Burlingame)
 Notre Dame High School (Belmont)
 Sacred Heart Preparatory (Atherton)
 Woodside Priory School, Portola Valley

Closed schools
 Mercy High School

Seminaries
St. Joseph's Seminary (Mountain View, California) (closed)
Saint Patrick's Seminary and University (Menlo Park, California)

Recognized lay ecclesial movements
 Fraternity of Communion and Liberation (CL). CL is an ecclesial association of Pontifical Right. Meetings are held weekly at St. Thomas More Church and the National Shrine of Saint Francis of Assisi.

Province of San Francisco
See List of the Catholic bishops of the United States

The Metropolitan Ecclesiastical Province of San Francisco covers Northern California north of the Monterey Bay, as well as all of Hawaii, Nevada, and Utah. The Archbishop of San Francisco, who is ex officio metropolitan bishop of the Province of San Francisco, has limited oversight responsibilities for the dioceses of Honolulu, Las Vegas, Oakland, Reno, Sacramento, Salt Lake City, San Jose, Santa Rosa, and Stockton.

See also

 Catholic Church by country
 Catholic Church in the United States
 Global organisation of the Catholic Church
 List of Roman Catholic archdioceses (by country and continent)
 List of Roman Catholic dioceses (alphabetical) (including archdioceses)
 List of Roman Catholic dioceses (structured view) (including archdioceses)
 List of the Catholic dioceses of the United States

References

External links

 
 Cathedral of Saint Mary of the Assumption
 Catholic San Francisco Article on the 40th Anniversary

 
Religious organizations established in 1853
Organizations based in the San Francisco Bay Area
San Francisco
San Francisco
1853 establishments in California